National PTSD Awareness Day is a day dedicated to creating awareness regarding PTSD (Post Traumatic Stress Disorder). It is acknowledged annually on June 27. The US Senate officially designated this day in 2010. In 2014 the Senate designated the whole month of June as PTSD Awareness Month.

In the US, 6.8% of adults will experience PTSD in their lifetimes with women twice as likely as men to experience it (10.4% to 5%) frequently as a result of sexual trauma.  Veterans are another group highly likely to experience PTSD during their lives, with Vietnam War veterans at 30%, Gulf War veterans at 10%, and Iraq War veterans at 14%.

On this day, organizations that work with employees, consumers, and patients at risk for the condition work to get information about symptoms and treatments for it out to the public in the hopes that when more people know about the disease more people who suffer from it will get treatment.  The US Department of Defense is one of the major organizations involved.

References

June observances
Post-traumatic stress disorder
Health awareness days
Disability observances